This is a list of the Yugoslavia national football team games between 1970 and 1992.

Socialist Federal Republic of Yugoslavia

1970

1971

1972

1973

1974

1975

1976

1977

1978

1979

1980

1981

1982

1983

1984

1985

1986

1987

1988

1989

1990

1991

1992

See also
Yugoslavia national football team results (1920–41)
Yugoslavia national football team results (1946–69)
Croatia national football team results
Serbia national football team results

External links
Results at RSSSF 

Yugoslavia national football team results